John William Campbell (2 October 1877 – 20 January 1919) was a Scottish footballer who played as an outside left for Linthouse, Partick Thistle, Blackburn Rovers, Rangers, West Ham United, Hibernian and the Scotland national team.

Life and career 
Campbell was born in Glasgow and gained the most success in his career with Rangers with whom he won four successive league titles (1898–99, 1899–1900, 1900–01 and 1901–02) the first of which Rangers won all 18 of their Scottish league matches. He played alongside Jack Wilkie at four clubs.

He also represented Scotland at international level, winning four caps and scoring six goals, including a double in Scotland's biggest ever win – an 11–0 defeat of Ireland in February 1901. He also appeared for the Scottish League XI.

After his football career he became a ship's steward, but died aged just 41 from tuberculosis.

Honours 
Rangers
 Scottish League Division One: 1898–99, 1899–1900, 1900–01, 1901–02
 Glasgow Cup 1900–01
 Glasgow Merchants Charity Cup: 1898–99, 1899–1900
Scottish Cup: Runner-up 1898–99

Career statistics

References

1877 births
1919 deaths
Footballers from Glasgow
Association football outside forwards
Scottish footballers
Scotland international footballers
Partick Thistle F.C. players
Blackburn Rovers F.C. players
Rangers F.C. players
West Ham United F.C. players
Hibernian F.C. players
Gillingham F.C. players
Scottish Football League players
Scottish Football League representative players
Linthouse F.C. players
Bo'ness F.C. players
Dumbarton Harp F.C. players
English Football League players
Southern Football League players
20th-century deaths from tuberculosis
Tuberculosis deaths in Scotland